Maksim Alekseyevich Molokoyedov (born 24 December 1987) is a former Russian professional football player. He played as a midfielder.

Criminal conviction
In 2010, Molokoyedov was convicted in Chile to three years of imprisonment for carrying six kilograms of cocaine. In 2012, he signed a professional contract with the second-level team Santiago Morning with one year still remaining on his sentence. He was let out to play and train on day leave. In February 2013 he finished his prison term and was allowed to stay in the country.

External links

References

1987 births
People from Pskov Oblast
Living people
Russian footballers
Russia youth international footballers
Association football midfielders
FC Petrotrest players
FC Dynamo Saint Petersburg players
Santiago Morning footballers
Primera B de Chile players
Russian expatriate footballers
Expatriate footballers in Chile
Russian expatriate sportspeople in Chile
Russian people imprisoned abroad
Prisoners and detainees of Chile
Sportspeople from Pskov Oblast